Barsine is a genus of moths in the family Erebidae.

Species
Barsine contains the following species:
 Barsine andromeda Volynkin, Černý & Huang, 2019
 Barsine atypicobarsine N. Singh, Kirti & Joshi, 2016
 Barsine biformis Volynkin & Černý, 2019
 Barsine cacharensis N.Singh, Kirti & Kaleka, 2016
 Barsine callorufa Wu, Fu & Chang, 2013
 Barsine conicornutata (Holloway, 1982)
 Barsine cornutodefecta N. Singh, Kirti & Kaleka, 2016
 Barsine curtisi (Butler, 1881)
 Barsine dao Volynkin, Černý & Huang, 2019
 Barsine defecta Walker, 1854
 Barsine delicia Swinhoe, 1891
 Barsine deliciosa Volynkin & Černý, 2016
 Barsine devikulensis N. Singh & Kirti, 2016
 Barsine epixantha (Meyrick, 1894)
 Barsine euprepia (Hampson, 1900)
 Barsine eurydice Volynkin & Černý, 2019
 Barsine excelsa (Daniel, 1952)
 Barsine flammealis Moore, 1878
 Barsine flavicollis (Moore, 1878)
 Barsine fossi Volynkin & Černý, 2017
 Barsine fuscozonata (Inoue, 1980)
 Barsine germana (Rothschild, 1913)
 Barsine gilveola (Daniel, 1952)
 Barsine gratiosa (Guérin-Méneville, 1843)
 Barsine gratissima (de Joannis, 1930)
 Barsine guangxiensis (Fang, 1991)
 Barsine hausmanni Volynkin & Černý, 2019
 Barsine hemimelaena (de Joannis, 1928)
 Barsine hoenei (Reich, 1937)
 Barsine hololeuca (Hampson, 1895)
 Barsine kampoli Černý, 2009
 Barsine laszloi Volynkin & Černý, 2019
 Barsine linga Moore, 1859
 Barsine lucibilis Swinhoe, 1892
 Barsine mactans Butler, 1877
 Barsine marcelae Černý, 2016
 Barsine nigrovena (Fang, 2000)
 Barsine obsoleta (Reich, 1937)
 Barsine orientalis (Daniel, 1951)
 Barsine pardalis (Mell, 1922)
 Barsine perlucidula Bucsek, 2012
 Barsine perpallida (Hampson, 1900)
 Barsine ponlai Wu, Fu & Chang, 2013
 Barsine pretiosa Moore, 1879
 Barsine pseudomactans Volynkin & Černý, 2016
 Barsine pseudoorientalis N. Singh & Kirti, 2016
 Barsine pulchra (Butler, 1877)
 Barsine roseata (Walker, 1864)
 Barsine rosistriata (Holloway, 1976)
 Barsine rubrata (Reich, 1937)
 Barsine rubricostata (Herrich-Schäffer, 1855)
 Barsine ruficollis (Fang, 1991)
 Barsine rufumdefecta N. Singh & Kirti, 2016
 Barsine sauteri (Strand, 1917)
 Barsine sieglindae Černý, 2016
 Barsine kulingensis (Daniel, 1952)
 Barsine striata (Bremer & Grey, 1852)
 Barsine thomasi Kaleka, 2003
 Barsine ustrina Černý, 2009
 Barsine valvalis Kaleka, 2003
 Barsine vinhphucensis Spitsyn, Kondakov, Tomilova, Pham & Bolotov, 2018
 Barsine wangi Volynkin, Huang, Dubatolov & Kishida, 2019
 Barsine yuennanensis (Daniel, 1952)

References

  & , 2013: New species of lichen-moths from South-East Asia (Lepidoptera, Noctuoidea, Lithosiini). Tinea, 22 (4): 279–291. Full article: .
 
 , 1931: New Species and Forms of Arctiidæ from Japan. Insecta Matsumurana, 5 (1-2): 31–40. Full article: .

External links

Nudariina
Moth genera